Carnatic, launched in 1770, was an East Indiaman belonging to the French East India Company. A British letter of marque captured her in 1778. She became a transport. She was wrecked in 1781.

Career
Carnatic was sailing from India to France when on 28 October 1778 she encountered the Liverpool privateer . War between Britain and France had broken out in April 1778 and Captain John Dawson sailed Mentor south to attempt to intercept French vessels coming from the Indian Ocean that were not aware of the outbreak of hostilities. When Carnatic came into Liverpool, she was said to be worth £135,000 and the richest prize ever taken and brought safe into port by a Liverpool privateer. Part of the value was due to a box of diamonds that had been found on her. Peter Baker, Mentors owner, retained ownership of Carnatic.

Carnatic first appeared in Lloyd's Register (LR) in the volume for 1779.

Lloyd's List reported in February 1780 that Carnatic and several other vessels had come into Cork in distress. Carnatic was on her way back to Britain from the West Indies.

Loss
A gale in the night between 1 and 2 August 1781 at Jamaica drove Carnatic, Gibbons, master, on shore. Although the initial expectation was that she and most of the other vessels that also were driven on shore would be gotten off, the next report had Carnatic and numerous other vessels totally lost; it was hoped that some cargo could be saved.

Notes

Citations

References
 

1770 ships
Ships built in France
Captured ships
Age of Sail merchant ships of England
Maritime incidents in 1781